Nomophila nearctica, the lucerne moth, clover nomophila, false webworm,  celery stalkworm or American celery webworm,  is a moth of the family Crambidae. It is known from southern Canada and all of the United States, south to Mexico and the Neotropics.

The wingspan is 24–35 mm. When at rest, adults keep their wings overlapped and hugged against the abdomen, giving a long and narrow profile. The forewing is elongate, grayish-brown with two side-by-side dark oval spots near the middle of the wing, and another dark bilobed spot a little farther out. The hindwings are much broader. They are pale brownish-gray with a whitish fringe.

Adults are on wing from April to November in North America.

The larvae feed on celery, grasses, lucerne, Medicago sativa, Polygonum, Melilotus and various other low-growing herbaceous plants. They have a black head. The abdomen is variably light brown to dark gray with a bumpy surface and sparse long hairs and a thin dark dorsal line bordered by narrow pale strip.

References

Spilomelinae
Moths described in 1973